Kenneth L. Shropshire (born February 27, 1955) is an African-American author, attorney, consultant, educator, CEO of the Global Sport Institute and adidas Distinguished Professor of Global Sport at Arizona State University. He is Professor Emeritus at the Wharton School retiring after as the David W. Hauck Professor at the Wharton School of the University of Pennsylvania and the Director of the Wharton Sports Business Initiative and a past president of the Sports Lawyers Association. He is a director at Moelis & Company.

For 30 years Kenneth L. Shropshire was the David W. Hauck Professor at the Wharton School of the University of Pennsylvania and the Faculty Director of its Wharton Sports Business Initiative. He served as Chairman of the School's Legal Studies and Business Ethics department from 2000 to 2005. Shropshire joined the Wharton faculty in 1986 and specializes in sports business and law, sports and social impact, and negotiations. At Wharton among other things, he is researching antitrust issues, contracts, negotiation and dispute resolution, sports law, and the sports industry. His current research focuses on sport and social impact. He is particularly interested in how sport has been used to impact social conditions in the United States and around the globe. This research has taken him frequently to South Africa, where he focuses on the Royal Bafokeng Nation as well as Brazil and Jamaica.

When the NFL sought to revive its Career Symposium Shropshire assisted them in hosting the event at Wharton. This after leading the Business Management and Entrepreneurial Program for NFL players at Wharton since 2004.

The most recent of his 12 books are The Miseducation of the Student Athlete, Negotiate Like the Pros: A Top Sports Negotiator's Lessons for Making Deals, Building Relationships and Getting What You Want, The Business of Sports and Being Sugar Ray: The Life of America's Greatest Boxer and First Celebrity Athlete. His works include the foundational books, In Black and White: Race and Sports in America, and The Business of Sports Agents. Related to these works Shropshire has provided commentary for a number of media outlets including Nightline, CNN, the New York Times, USA Today, The Wall Street Journal, National Public Radio and Sports Illustrated.

References

External links 
 Official website
 University profile

1955 births
Living people
African-American educators
African-American lawyers
American lawyers
African-American writers
Columbia Law School alumni
Stanford University alumni
Wharton School of the University of Pennsylvania faculty
American sportswriters
21st-century African-American people
20th-century African-American people